was a town located in Mikata District, Hyōgo Prefecture, Japan.

As of 2003, the town had an estimated population of 10,835 and a density of 105.21 persons per km2. The total area was 102.98 km2.

On October 1, 2005, Hamasaka, along with the town of Onsen (also from Mikata District), was merged to create the town of Shin'onsen.

Dissolved municipalities of Hyōgo Prefecture
Shin'onsen, Hyōgo